Titanio nissalis is a moth in the family Crambidae. It was described by Hans Georg Amsel in 1951 and is found in Iran.

References

Moths described in 1951
Odontiini
Taxa named by Hans Georg Amsel
Insects of Iran